Strobilops hubbardi is a land snail of the Americas. It is known to be found in Southern parts of the United States, including Georgia, Alabama, and Florida. It was confirmed in 2018 to be living in South Texas.

References

Strobilopsidae
Gastropods described in 1861